Chandraprabha Aitwal (born 24 December 1941) is an Indian mountain climber and one of the pioneers of Indian women mountaineers. She was awarded 2009 Tenzing Norgay National Adventure Award for Lifetime Achievement, given by the Indian Ministry of Youth Affairs and Sports. She has climbed Nanda Devi, Kangchenjunga, Trishuli and Mt. Jaonli.

Early life and background
Aitwal grew up in Dharchula in Pithoragarh district of Uttarakhand.

Career
Over the years she has reached the summits of several of peaks, including Nanda Devi in 1981. She was also part of Indian Mountaineering Federation's sponsored Mount Everest campaign in 1984. In August 2009, at the age of 68, she reached the summit of Mount Srikantha in the Garhwal Himalaya, an elevation of 6,133 m, for the second time as part of an all-woman expedition of the Indian Mountaineering Federation.

Awards
Arjun Award
Padma Shri, India’s fourth highest civilian honors in 1990

See also
List of Mount Everest records of India

References

External links
http://pibmumbai.gov.in/scripts/detail.asp?releaseId=E2010PR1461
http://www.apnauttarakhand.com/chandra-prabha-aitwal/ 
http://www.himalayanclub.org/journal/men-and-womens-ascent-of-nanda-devi/

Indian female mountain climbers
Indian mountain climbers
Living people
1941 births
People from Pithoragarh district
Indian summiters of Mount Everest
Recipients of the Padma Shri in sports
Recipients of the Tenzing Norgay National Adventure Award
Sportswomen from Uttarakhand
20th-century Indian women
20th-century Indian people
Mountain climbers from Uttarakhand
Recipients of the Arjuna Award